Curri may refer to:

Asllan Curri (?-1925), a member of the kachak movement
Debatik Curri, Albanian footballer
Bajram Curri, (1862–1925) Albanian politician
Hysni Curri, Kosovar Albanian revolutionary
Skerdilaid Curri, Albanian footballer

Albanian-language surnames